Amanda N. Nguyen (born  1991) is a social entrepreneur, civil rights activist, and the CEO and founder of Rise, a non-governmental civil rights organization. She was involved in proposing and drafting the Sexual Assault Survivors' Rights Act, which passed unanimously in Congress. Nguyen has also been credited with kickstarting the movement to stop violence against Asian Americans after her video calling for media coverage went viral on February 5, 2021. In recognition of her work, Nguyen was nominated for the 2019 Nobel Peace Prize and was named one of the 2022 Time Women of the Year. She has also received the 24th Annual Heinz Award in Public Policy, Time 100 Next, Forbes 30 Under 30, and was credited as a Top 100 Global Thinker by Foreign Policy. Furthermore, Nguyen is featured in the 2022 anthology We Are Here: 30 Inspiring Asian Americans and Pacific Islanders Who Have Shaped the United States by Naomi Hirahara and published by the Smithsonian Institution and Running Press Kids.

Education and career

Nguyen earned a Bachelor of Arts at Harvard University, graduating in 2013.

She interned at NASA in 2013, and has also worked at the Center for Astrophysics  Harvard & Smithsonian. She worked as the Deputy White House Liaison for the U.S. Department of State. She left her job at the State Department in 2016 to work full-time at Rise. Encouraged by her mentors during her time at NASA, she aspires to become an astronaut. Nguyen is also on the board of directors of GivingTuesday,.

Activism

In 2013, Nguyen was raped while she was in college at Harvard in Massachusetts. Nguyen chose not to press charges immediately since she did not feel she had the necessary time and resources to participate in a trial that could potentially last for years. After police officers informed her there was a 15-year statute of limitations for rape in Massachusetts, she decided she would press charges at a later date when she was ready. She had a rape kit performed and discovered that, if she did not report the crime to law enforcement, her rape kit would be destroyed after six months if an extension request was not filed. She was also not given official instructions on how to file for an extension. Nguyen considered this system to be broken, partially because the extension request would be an unnecessary reminder of a traumatizing experience.  Nguyen met other survivors with similar stories and concluded that the current legal protections were insufficient. She has created publicized events such as a fashion show during New York Fashion Week in the Museum of Modern Art, with models who were survivors of sexual assault.

Rise 
In November 2014, Nguyen founded Rise, a nonprofit organisation which is aimed to protect the civil rights of sexual assault and rape survivors. Nguyen headed the organization in her spare time until September 2016. Everyone who works with Rise is a volunteer, and the organization has raised money through GoFundMe. Nguyen explained that the organization was named Rise to "remind us that a small group of thoughtful, committed citizens can rise up and change the world".  Nguyen's aim is for Rise to pass a Sexual Assault Survivor Bill of Rights in all 50 U.S. states as well as on the national level. She has also travelled to Japan where a similar bill was presented.

Sexual Assault Survivors' Rights Act

In July 2015, Nguyen met with New Hampshire Senator Jeanne Shaheen to discuss legislation that would protect survivor rights on the federal level. Legislation that Nguyen had helped draft was introduced to Congress in February 2016 by Shaheen. Nguyen collaborated with Change.org and comedy website Funny or Die to draw attention to the legislation and encourage voters to support it. Nguyen launched a Change.org petition that called on Congress to pass the legislation. The Funny or Die video and Change.org petition received support from Judd Apatow and Patricia Arquette on Twitter. As of February 28, 2016, the Change.org petition gained 60,000 of the 75,000 requested signatures. By October 2016, there were more than 100,000 signatures.

The bill passed through the Senate in May and the House of Representatives in September. It passed unanimously in both chambers of Congress, and was signed into law in October 2016 by President Barack Obama. The new law protects, among other rights, the right to have the evidence of a rape kit preserved without charge for the duration of the statute of limitations.

On October 12, 2017, California governor Jerry Brown approved a bill titled "Sexual assault victims: rights".

We the Future Portrait
In 2018, Shepard Fairey created a portrait of Amanda Nguyen for Amplifier's "We the Future" campaign, a series of commissioned art pieces that were sent to 20,000 middle and high schools around the United States to teach about various grassroots movements.

Awards and honors 
Awards and prizes
 2016 – Young Women's Honors Award, Marie Claire
 2016 – Top 100 Global Thinkers, Foreign Policy
 2017 – 2017 Women's March Honored Guest and Speaker
 2017 – Forbes 30 Under 30, Forbes
 2017 – 40 Women to Watch, The Tempest
 2018 – The Frederick Douglass 200 List
 2019 – Nelson Mandela Changemaker Award
 2019 – 24th Annual Heinz Awards in Public Policy
 2019 – Vanity Fair Global Goals, Vanity Fair
 2019 – Time 100 Next, Time
 2021 - She was recognized as one of the BBC's 100 women
 2022 - Time Woman of the Year, Time

Personal life

Born in California, Nguyen resides in Washington, D.C.

References

External links
 
 Rise Sexual Assault Bill of Rights Achievement Timeline image.

Sexual abuse victim advocates
Organization founders
Harvard University alumni
American people of Vietnamese descent
1990s births
Living people
21st-century American women
BBC 100 Women